Fabrizia Sacchi (born 10 February 1971) is an Italian actress.

Sacchi was born in Naples. Her acting credits include Viaggio sola, Fuoriclasse, Medicina generale and The First Beautiful Thing. In 2013 she was nominated to David di Donatello for Best Supporting Actress for her performance in A Five Star Life.

Filmography

External links

References

Living people
Italian film actresses
Italian television actresses
1971 births